Shadows in the Night is a 1950 West German drama film directed by Eugen York and starring Hilde Krahl, Willy Fritsch and Carl Raddatz. It was made at the Wandsbek Studios by the Hamburg-based Real Film. The film's sets were designed by the art director Herbert Kirchhoff.

Synopsis
A happily married woman is blackmailed by a former lover.

Cast
 Hilde Krahl as Elga
 Willy Fritsch as Ernst Magnus
 Carl Raddatz as Richard Struwe
 Josef Sieber as Mumme
 Hermann Schomberg as Edgar Elsberg
 Arnim Dahl as Freitag
 Carl-Heinz Schroth as Minjes
 Lilo Müller as Heidi
 Ursula Herking as Julia
 Thessy Kuhls as Margit
 Inge Meysel as Lisa
 Albert Florath as Kommissar
 Franz Schafheitlin
 Helmut Gmelin
 Änne Bruck
 Karl-Heinz Peters as Wirt
 Carl Voscherau

References

Bibliography 
 Bock, Hans-Michael & Bergfelder, Tim. The Concise CineGraph. Encyclopedia of German Cinema. Berghahn Books, 2009.

External links 
 

1950 films
West German films
German drama films
1950 drama films
1950s German-language films
Films directed by Eugen York
Films shot at Wandsbek Studios
Real Film films
German black-and-white films
1950s German films